This is a list of protests in the 21st century.

Revolutions and uprisings

Plants (Colour) revolutions 
 Rose Revolution (Georgia, 2003)
 Tulip Revolution (Kyrgyzstan, 2005)
 Cedar Revolution (Lebanon, 2005)
 Orange Revolution (Ukraine, 2004–2005)
 Saffron Revolution (Myanmar, 2007)

Arab Spring

 2010–2012 Algerian protests
 2011 Bahraini uprising
 2011 Turkish Cypriot protests
 2011 Djiboutian protests
 2011 Egyptian revolution
 2011–2012 Jordanian protests
 2011 Iraqi protests
 2011 Lebanese protests
 First Libyan Civil War
 2011–2012 Mauritanian protests
 2011–2012 Moroccan protests
 2011 Western Saharan protests
 2011 Omani protests
 2011–2012 Palestinian protests
 2011–2012 Saudi Arabian protests
 2011–2013 Sudanese protests
 Civil uprising phase of the Syrian civil war
 Tunisian Revolution
 Yemeni Revolution

Arab Winter
 2012–2013 Egyptian protests
 Post-coup unrest in Egypt (2013–2014)
 2012–2013 Iraqi protests
 2015–2016 Iraqi protests
 2013–2014 Tunisian political crisis

Second Arab Spring 

 2018 Tunisian protests
 2018 Jordanian protests
 2018 Iraqi protests
 (2018–2019): Sudanese Revolution
 2019 Gaza economic protests
 2019 Egyptian protests
 2019–2021 Iraqi protests
 17 October Revolution
 2019–2021 Algerian protests
 2021 Tunisian protests

2019–2022 Latin American protests 

 2018–2022 Haitian protests
 2019 Bolivian protests
 2019 Venezuelan protests
 2019 Puerto Rican protests
 2019 Ecuadorian protests
 2019–2020 Colombian protests
 2019–2022 Chilean protests
 2020 Dominican protests
 2020 Bolivian protests
 2020 Peruvian protests
 2020–2021 Argentinian protests
 2021 Paraguayan protests
 2021 Colombian protests
 2021 Cuban protests
 2021 Brazilian protests
 2022 Ecuadorian protests
 2022 Panamanian protests
 2022–2023 Peruvian protests

Other 

 (2000–2005, Palestine): Second Intifada
 (2001, Philippines): Second EDSA Revolution
 (2001, Philippines): EDSA III
 (2004–2019, Syria, Iraq, Turkey): Rojava conflict
 Kyrgyz Revolution of 2010
 (2013–2014, Ukraine): Euromaidan
 (2014): Abkhazian Revolution
 2014 Burkinabé uprising
 2017–2019 Romanian protests
 2018 Armenian revolution
 2019–2020 Hong Kong protests
 2020–2021 Belarusian protests
 2020–2022 United States racial unrest
 2020–2021 Bulgarian protests
 Serbian protests (2020–present)
2020–2021 Armenian protests
2021 Greek protests
2022 Sri Lankan protests
2022 Armenian protests
2021–2023 Myanmar protests
2022 Albanian protests
2022 Karakalpak protests
2022 North Macedonia protests
2022 Sierra Leone protests
Mahsa Amini protests
2022 Mongolian protests

Specific issues

Anti-austerity 

 2016 Newfoundland and Labrador budget protests (Canada)
 Anti-austerity movement in Greece
 Anti-austerity movement in Ireland
 2011 Rome demonstration
 2012 Sicilian protests
 2013 Italian social protests
 Anti-austerity movement in Portugal
 Anti-austerity movement in Spain
 Asturian miners' strike of 2012
 Anti-austerity movement in the United Kingdom
 2019–2021 Lebanese protests

Anti-war 

 Protests against the war in Afghanistan
 Protests against the Iraq War
 Protests regarding the Russo-Georgian War
 Protests against the 2011 military intervention in Libya
 2014 anti-war protests in Russia
 Protests against the Sri Lankan Civil War
 Protests in Canada against the Sri Lankan Civil War
 Protests against the 2021 Israel–Palestine crisis
 Protests against the 2022 Russian invasion of Ukraine

Autonomy or independence 

 2005 Ahvaz unrest (Iran)
 Catalonia
 2010 Catalan autonomy protest
 2012 Catalan independence demonstration
 Catalan Way (2013)
 Catalan Way 2014
 Free Way to the Catalan Republic (2015)
 Go ahead, Catalan Republic (2016)
 National Day for Yes (2017)
 2017 Catalan general strike
 Wake Up Europe! (2017)
 Fem la República Catalana (2018)
 2019 Catalan general strike
 2019–2020 Catalan protests
 Annexation of Crimea by the Russian Federation
 2014 pro-Russian unrest in Ukraine
 Hong Kong
 2014 Hong Kong protests
 2016 Mong Kok civil unrest
 2019–2020 Hong Kong protests
 2016–2017 Kashmir unrest (India)
 Kurdistan
 December 2009 Kurdish protests in Turkey
 2011 Kurdish protests in Iraq
 2011–2012 Kurdish protests in Turkey
 2014 Kobanî protests
 2019 Papua protests (Indonesia)
 March and Rally for Scottish Independence (2012–2013)
 Hirak Rif Movement (Morocco)
 Telangana movement (India)
 Gdeim Izik protest camp (Morocco)

Against elections 

 2003–2004 Armenian protests
 Protests against Faure Gnassingbé (Togo, 2005–2021)
 Jeans Revolution (Belarus, 2006)
 
 2008 Armenian presidential election protests
 April 2009 Moldovan parliamentary election protests
 2009 Iranian presidential election protests
  (Peru)
 2011–2013 Russian protests
 Yo Soy 132 (Mexico, 2012)
 2012 NIS public opinion manipulation scandal (South Korea)
 2013 Venezuelan presidential election protests
 Malaysia's Post General Election rally 2013
 Protests against Donald Trump (United States, 2016–2020)
 Demonstrations in support of Donald Trump
 2017 Serbian protests
 2017–2018 Honduran protests
 Venezuelan presidential crisis
 2018 Armenian revolution
 May 2019 Jakarta protests and riots
 2019 Bolivian protests
 2020 Kyrgyzstani protests
 2020–2021 Belarusian protests
 January 6 United States Capitol attack
 2022 Brazilian election protests

Post-Arab Spring protests 
 2016 Tunisian protests
 2018 Tunisian protests
 2013–2014 Tunisian political crisis
 2019 Egyptian protests
 2020 Egyptian protests
 2012–2013 Egyptian protests
 Post-coup unrest in Egypt (2013–2014)
 2019–2021 Algerian protests
 2018 Jordanian protests
 2018–2019 Gaza border protests
 2019 Gaza economic protests
 Sudanese Revolution
 2019–2022 Sudanese protests
 2019–2021 Lebanese protests
 2015–2016 Lebanese protests
 2019–2021 Iraqi protests
 2012–2013 Iraqi protests
 2015–2018 Iraqi protests
 2020 Libyan protests
 Bahrain Tamarod
 Hirak Rif Movement
 2021 Tunisian protests

Women's rights 

 March for Women's Lives (2004) (United States)
 Ni una menos (Argentina, 2015–2021)
 NiUnaMenos (Peru, 2016)
 2017 Women's March (United States)
 Protests against Executive Order 13769 (United States, 2017)
 Ele Não movement (Brazil, 2018)
 2018 Chilean feminist protests and strikes
  (Mexico, 2018)
 2018 Spanish women's strike
 2018 Women's March (United States)
 2019 Women's March (United States)
 Vanitha Mathil (India, 2019)
 2019 Swiss women's strike (Switzerland)
 
 
 2020–2021 women's strike protests in Poland
 Mahsa Amini Protests (Iran, September 2022)

Anti-abortion 
 March for Life and Family (Poland, 2007–2009)
 March for Life (Prague) (Czech Republic, 2001–2014)
 March for Life (Paris) (France, 2005–2019)
 March for Life (Washington, D.C.) (United States, 2000–2021)
 Salvemos las dos Vidas (Argentina, 2017–2020)

Student protests 

 (Canada): 2005 Quebec student protests
 2006 student protests in Chile
 
 2007–2009 university protests in France
 (2007, South Africa): #FeesMustFall
 (2008, Netherlands): Dutch pupil strike
 2008 student protests in Chile
 2009 student protests in Austria
 2009 student protests in Croatia
 
 (Ireland): 2010 student protest in Dublin
 2010 United Kingdom student protests
 2010–2011 University of Puerto Rico strikes
 2011 Colombian student protests
 2011–2013 Chilean student protests
 (2012, Hong Kong): Moral and National Education controversy
 (Canada): 2012 Quebec student protests
 
 2014 Hong Kong class boycott campaign
 2014, Hong Kong Umbrella Movement
 (2014, Taiwan):  Sunflower Student Movement
 (2015, South Africa): #RhodesMustFall
 (Canada): 
 2015 Bangladesh student protests against VAT on education
 (2015, Taiwan): Anti-Black Box Curriculum Movement
 (2015, Malaysia): Tangkap Najib rally
 (2015–2016, Japan): SEALDs (Students Emergency Action for Liberal Democracy)
 (2015–2016, United States of America): 2015–2016 University of Missouri protests
 2016 student protests in Brazil
 2018 Bangladesh road-safety protests
 (Mexico): 2018 UNAM protests
 2018 student protests in Colombia
 2018–2019 student protest in Albania
 
 2019 student protests in Costa Rica
 
 (Turkey): 2021 Boğaziçi University protests
 September 2022 Iranian protests

Other protests by country

International 

 Anti-Japanese protests
 2005 anti-Japanese demonstrations
 2012 China anti-Japanese demonstrations
 Black Lives Matter
 George Floyd protests
 Extinction Rebellion (XR)
 2018–2019 Gaza border protests
 15 October 2011 global protests
 May Day
 2009 May Day protests
 2012 May Day protests
 2013 May Day protests
 2014 May Day protests
 2015 May Day protests
 2017 May Day protests
 Ni una menos
 NiUnaMenos (Peru)
 Occupy movement
 Protests against Donald Trump
 2017 Women's March
 Protests against Executive Order 13769
 2018 Women's March
 2019 Women's March
 2020 Women's March
 Pro-immigrants protests
 Baxter protests
 2006 United States immigration reform protests
 Day Without Immigrants 2017
 Protest "Volem acollir"
 Protests against the Trump administration family separation policy
 Citizenship Amendment Act protests
 Anti-immigrants protests
 Russian marches
 2015 Geldermalsen riot
 2018 Chemnitz protests
 School strike for climate / Fridays for Future (FFF)
 Protests over responses to the COVID-19 pandemic
 2020 Brazilian protests
 2021 Brazilian protests
 
 Protests over COVID-19 policies in Germany
 COVID-19 protests in Netherlands
 COVID-19 anti-lockdown protests in New Zealand
 2020 Serbian protests
 2020 United States anti-lockdown protests
 COVID-19 anti-lockdown protests in the United Kingdom
 2022 COVID-19 protests in China
 Strikes during the COVID-19 pandemic

National 

Afghanistan 
 2012 Afghanistan Quran burning protests
 2019–2020 Afghanistan protests
 2021 Afghan protests
Albania
 2011 Albanian opposition demonstrations
 2017 Albanian opposition protest
 National Theatre protest in Albania (2018–2020)
 2019–2021 Albanian political crisis
Algeria
 Black Spring (Algeria)
 2010–2012 Algerian protests
 2019–2021 Algerian protests
 2021 Algerian protests
Argentina
 December 2001 riots in Argentina
 2008 Argentine agrarian strike
 September 2012 cacerolazo in Argentina
 8N (2012)
 18A (2013)
 2013 police revolts in Argentina
 13N (Argentina) (2014)
 18F (demonstration) (2015)
 
 
 
  (2018)
 17A (2020)
 2020–2021 Argentinian protests
Armenia
 2003–2004 Armenian protests
 2008 Armenian presidential election protests
 2011 Armenian protests
 Mashtots Park Movement (2012)
 2013 Armenian protests
 Electric Yerevan (2015)
 2018 Armenian revolution
 October 2018 protests in Armenia
 2020–2021 Armenian protests
 2022 Armenian protests
Azerbaijan
 2003 Azerbaijani protests
 2011 Azerbaijani protests
 2013 Baku protests
 2016 Azerbaijani protests
 2019 Baku protests
 July 2020 Azerbaijani protests 
Bangladesh
 2013 Shahbag protests
 2015 Bangladesh student protests against VAT on education
 2018 Bangladesh quota reform movement
 2018 Bangladesh road-safety protests
 2018–2019 Bangladesh protests and unrest
 2020 Bangladesh protests
Belarus
 Jeans Revolution
 2010 Belarusian protests
 2011 Belarusian protests
 Teddybear Airdrop Minsk 2012
 2017 Belarusian protests
 2019 Belarusian protests
 2020–2021 Belarusian protests
Belize
 2005 Belize unrest
Bolivia
 2008 unrest in Bolivia
 2011 Bolivian indigenous rights protests
 2019 Bolivian protests
 2020 Bolivian protests
Bosnia and Herzegovina
 JMBG protests
 2014 unrest in Bosnia and Herzegovina
 2018–2019 Bosnian protests
Brazil
 2013 protests in Brazil
 2014 protests in Brazil
 2015–2016 protests in Brazil
 2017 Brazilian general strike
 2018 Brazil truck drivers' strike
 
 
 2020 Brazilian protests
 2021 Brazilian protests
Bulgaria
 2011 Bulgaria antiziganist protests
 2013 Bulgarian protests against the first Borisov cabinet
 2013–2014 Bulgarian protests against the Oresharski cabinet
 2020–2021 Bulgarian protests
Burkina Faso
 2011 Burkinabé protests
 2014 Burkinabé uprising
Burundi
 Burundian unrest (2015–2018)
Cambodia
 2013–2014 Cambodian protests
Cameroon
 2008 Cameroonian anti-government protests
 2016–2017 Cameroonian protests
Canada
 2010 Canada anti-prorogation protests
 Idle No More (2012)
 2020 Canadian pipeline and railway protests
 2022 Canada Convoy protest
Chile
 2006 student protests in Chile
 2008 student protests in Chile
 2011 Magallanes protests
 2012 Aysén protests
 2019–2021 Chilean protests
China
 2011 Chinese pro-democracy protests
 Wukan protests (2011)
 Jasic Incident (2018)
 2022 COVID-19 protests in China
Colombia
 2013 Colombian coffee growers strike
 
 2019–2020 Colombian protests
 Javier Ordóñez protests
 2021 Colombian protests
Costa Rica
 2018 Costa Rican protests
Cuba
 2021 Cuban protests
Czech Republic
 2017 Czech government crisis
 Milion chvilek pro demokracii (2018–2021)
 Je to na nás!
Djibouti 
 2011 Djiboutian protests
DR Congo
 19 January 2015 DRC protests
 December 2016 Congolese protests
 Anti-MONUSCO protests
Dominican Republic
 2017–2018 Dominican Republic protests
 2020 Dominican Republic protests
Ecuador
 2012 Ecuadorian protests
 2015 Ecuadorian protests
 2019 Ecuadorian protests
 2020 Ecuadorian protests
Egypt
 2008 Egyptian general strike
 Egyptian revolution of 2011
 2012–2013 Egyptian protests
 June 2013 Egyptian protests
 Post-coup unrest in Egypt (2013–2014)
 2019 Egyptian protests
 2020 Egyptian protests
Estonia
 Bronze Night (2007)
  (2012)
Eswatini
 2021 Eswatini protests
Ethiopia
 2016 Ethiopian protests
 October 2019 Ethiopian clashes
 Hachalu Hundessa riots
France
 2005 French riots
 2010 French pension reform strikes
 Republican marches (2015)
 2015 Corsican protests
 Nuit debout (2016)
 2017 French riots
 Protests against Emmanuel Macron (2017–2020)
 Yellow vests movement (2018–2020)
 2019–2020 French pension reform strike
 2021–2022 Social unrest in the French West Indies
 2022 Corsica unrest
 2023 French pension reform strikes
Gabon
 2016 Gabonese protests
Georgia
 Rose Revolution
 2007 Georgian demonstrations
 2009 Georgian demonstrations
 2011 Georgian protests
 2012 Georgian protests
 2019–2020 Georgian protests
 2023 Georgian protests
Germany
 
 Ende Gelände
 
 Ende Gelände 2016
 Ende Gelände 2017
 Ende Gelände 2018
 Ende Gelände 2019
 Ende Gelände 2020
Greece
 2021 Greek protests
Guatemala
 Escobal mine protests
 2015 Guatemalan protests
 2020 Guatemalan protests
Guinea
 2007 Guinean general strike
 2009 Guinean protests
 2019–2020 Guinean protests
Haiti
 2018–2021 Haitian protests
Honduras
 2017–2018 Honduran protests
 2019 Honduran protests
Hong Kong
 Hong Kong 1 July marches (2003)
 December 2005 protest for democracy in Hong Kong
 Anti-Hong Kong Express Rail Link movement (2009)
 Hong Kong new year marches (January 2010, January 2013)
 2010 Hong Kong democracy protests
 2014 Hong Kong protests
 2019–2020 Hong Kong protests
Hungary
 2006 protests in Hungary
 Hungarian protests of 2011
 2014 Hungarian Internet tax protests
 2018 protests in Hungary
Iceland
 2009 Icelandic financial crisis protests
 2016 Icelandic anti-government protests
India
 Amarnath land transfer controversy
 2006 Indian anti-reservation protests
 2006 Dalit protests in Maharashtra
 2010 Kashmir unrest
 2011 Indian anti-corruption movement
 Indian general strike of 2016
 2016–2017 Kashmir unrest
 2017 pro-jallikattu protests
 April 2018 caste protests in India
 Citizenship Amendment Act protests (2019–2020)
 Shaheen Bagh protests
 Citizenship Amendment Act protests in Uttar Pradesh
 2020 Kerala human chain
 2020 Delhi riots
 2019–2022 Amaravati protests
 2020 Kashmiri protests
 2020–2021 Indian farmers' protest
Indonesia
 November 2016 Jakarta protests
 December 2016 Jakarta protests
 February 2017 Jakarta protests
 2019 Indonesian protests and riots
 Indonesia omnibus bill protests
Iran
 2011–2012 Iranian protests
 2017–2018 Iranian protests
 2018–2019 Iranian general strikes and protests
 2018 Iranian water protests
 2019 Iranian fuel protests
 2019–2020 Iranian protests
 2022–2023 Iranian protests

Iraq
 2011 Iraqi protests
 2012–2013 Iraqi protests
 2015–2018 Iraqi protests
 2019–2021 Iraqi protests
Israel
 2006 Israeli reserve soldiers' protest
 Cottage cheese boycott (2011)
 2011 Israeli social justice protests
 July 2019 Ethiopian Jews protest in Israel
 Protests against Benjamin Netanyahu (2020–2021)
Italy
 No Berlusconi Day (2009)
 2012 Sicilian protests
 2013 Italian social protests
 Sardines movement (2019–2020)
Jordan 
 2011–2012 Jordanian protests
 2018 Jordanian protests
 2022 Jordanian protests
Kazakhstan
 Zhanaozen massacre (2011)
 2016 Kazakh protests
 2018–2020 Kazakh protests
 2022 Kazakh protests
Kenya
 2007–2008 Kenyan crisis
 2009 Kenya sex strike
 2017 Kenyan uprising
Kuwait
 2011–2012 Kuwaiti protests
Kyrgyzstan 
 Tulip Revolution
 Kyrgyz Revolution of 2010
 2013 Kyrgyzstani protests
 2020 Kyrgyzstani protests
Lebanon
 2006–2008 Lebanese protests
 2011 Lebanese protests
 2015–2016 Lebanese protests
 2019–2021 Lebanese protests
Libya 
 First Libyan Civil War#Anti-Gaddafi movement (2011)
 2020 Libyan protests
Macau
 2010 Macau transfer of sovereignty anniversary protest
Madagascar
 2009 Malagasy political crisis
 2018–2019 Malagasy protests
Malawi
 2011 Malawian protests
Malaysia
 2007 Bersih rally
 2007 HINDRAF rally
 Bersih 2.0 rally (2011)
 Bersih 3.0 rally (2012)
 People's Uprising rally, 2013
 Tangkap Najib rally (2015)
 Bersih 4 rally (2015)
 Bersih 5 rally (2016)
Mali
 2020 Malian protests
Malta
 2019–2020 Maltese protests
Mauritania
 2011–2012 Mauritanian protests
Mexico
 Mexican Indignados Movement (2011)
  (2012)
 2017 Mexican protests
 2020 Mexican protests
Moldova
 2013 Pro Europe demonstration in Moldova
 2015–2016 protests in Moldova
 2022–2023 Moldovan protests
Mongolia
 2008 riot in Mongolia
 2022 Mongolian protests
Montenegro
 2008 protest against Kosovo declaration of independence
 2015–2016 Montenegrin crisis
 2019 Montenegrin anti-corruption protests
 2019–2020 clerical protests in Montenegro
 2021 Montenegrin nationality law protests
Morocco 
 2011–2012 Moroccan protests
 Hirak Rif Movement
Mozambique 
 2010 Mozambican uprising
Myanmar
 Saffron Revolution (2007–2008)
 2021 Myanmar protests
Nepal
 2006 democracy movement in Nepal
 Protest against Guthi Bill (2019)
Netherlands
 Dutch farmers' protests
New Zealand
 2022 Wellington protests
Nicaragua
 2014–2020 Nicaraguan protests
 2018–2020 Nicaraguan protests
Nigeria
 2018–2019 Nigerian protests
 End SARS
 June 12 Nigerian protest (2021)
North Macedonia
 2011 Macedonian protests
 2014 Albanian demonstrations in the Republic of Macedonia
 2015 Macedonian protests
 2016 Macedonian protests
 2022 North Macedonia protests
Pakistan
 Lawyers' Movement (2007)
 Long March (2013)
 2014 Azadi March
 Inqilab March (2014)
 2017 Faizabad sit-in
 2019 Azadi March
 2021 Pakistani protests
Paraguay
 2017 Paraguayan crisis
 2021 Paraguayan protests
Peru
  (2008)
 2009 Peruvian political crisis
 2010 Peruvian coca growers strike
 2017–present Peruvian political crisis
 
 2018 Peruvian agrarian strike
 2020 Peruvian protests
 2020–2021 Peruvian agrarian strike
 2022–2023 Peruvian protests
Philippines
 Million People March (2013)
 Burial of Ferdinand Marcos (2016)
 Protests against Rodrigo Duterte (2016–2021)
Poland
 December 2016 Polish protests
 Protests against Polish judiciary reforms (2017)
 
 August 2020 LGBT protests in Poland
Puerto Rico
 2010–2011 University of Puerto Rico strikes
 2013 Puerto Rico teachers protest
 Telegramgate (2019)
Romania
 2012–2015 unrest in Romania
 2012 Romanian protests
 2012–2014 Romanian protests against shale gas
 2013 Romanian protests against the Roșia Montană Project
 2015 Romanian protests
 2017–2019 Romanian protests
Russia
 Dissenters' March (2005–2008)
 Strategy-31 (2009)
 2009–2010 Kaliningrad protests
 2011–2013 Russian protests
 2017–2018 Russian protests
 2018 Russian pension protests
 2018–2019 Ingushetia protests
 2019 Moscow protests
 2020–2021 Khabarovsk protests
 2021 Russian protests
Saudi Arabia 
 2011–2012 Saudi Arabian protests
Senegal 
 2011–2012 Senegalese protests
 2021 Senegalese protests
Serbia
 2008 protests against Kosovo declaration of independence
 2016 Serbian protests
 2017 Serbian protests
 2018–2020 Serbian protests
 July 2020 Serbian protests
 2021–2022 Serbian environmental protests
Slovakia
 Murder of Ján Kuciak (2018)
Slovenia
 2012–2013 Slovenian protests
 2020 Slovenian protests
South Africa
 Western Cape 2012 Farm Workers' strike
 FeesMustFall (2015–2016)
 2019 service delivery protests
 2021 South African unrest
 2023 South African National Shutdown
South Korea
 2008 US beef protest in South Korea
 2016–2017 South Korean protests
 Taegukgi rallies (2016–2018)
 2018–2019 South Korean protests
Spain
 2010 Spanish general strike
 Anti-austerity movement in Spain
 2017–2018 Spanish constitutional crisis
Sri Lanka
 2022 Sri Lankan protests
Sudan
 2011–2013 protests in Sudan
 Sudanese Revolution
 2019–2022 Sudanese protests
Syria
 Civil uprising phase of the Syrian civil war
 Syrian protests (2016)
 2020 Suweida protests
Taiwan
 Million Voices Against Corruption, President Chen Must Go (2006)
 1025 rally to safeguard Taiwan (2008)
 517 Protest (2009)
 Sunflower Student Movement (2014)
Thailand
 2005–2006 Thai political crisis
 2008 Thai political crisis
 2009 Thai political unrest
 2010 Thai political protests
 2013–2014 Thai political crisis
 2020–2021 Thai protests
Togo
 2010–2011 Togolese protests
 2005 Togo protests and riots
 2017–2018 Togolese protests
Tunisia
 Tunisian Revolution
 2013–2014 Tunisian political crisis
 2016 Tunisian protests
 2021 Tunisian protests
Turkey
 Republic protests (2007)
 Gezi Park protests (2013)
 2017 March for Justice
Ukraine
 Ukraine without Kuchma (2000–2001)
 Orange Revolution
 Rise up, Ukraine! (2013)
 2014 Ukrainian Revolution
 No to capitulation! (2019–2020)
United Kingdom
 2011 London anti-cuts protest
 2011 England riots
 Belfast City Hall flag protests (2012)
 Balcombe drilling protest (2013)
 2016–2019 United Kingdom rail strikes
 Kenmure Street protests (2021)
 Camp Beagle protest (2021-present)
United States
 2015 Armenian March for Justice
 2011 United States public employee protests
 Tea Party protests (2009)
 Occupy Wall Street (2011)
 2011 Wisconsin protests
 Protests against Donald Trump (2015–2020)
 2018 United States gun violence protests
 2018–2019 education workers' strikes in the United States
 Indigenous Peoples March (2019)
 George Floyd protests in Minneapolis–Saint Paul (2020)
 Breonna Taylor protests
 2020–2021 United States election protests
 2021 storming of the United States Capitol
Uzbekistan
 2005 Andijan unrest
 2019–2020 Uzbekistan protests
Venezuela
 Venezuelan general strike of 2002–2003
 2007 RCTV protests
 2013 Venezuelan presidential election protests
 Venezuelan protests (2014–present)
 2014 Venezuelan protests
 2017 Venezuelan protests
 2019 Venezuelan protests
 Mother of All Marches (2017)
 Venezuelan presidential crisis
Vietnam
 2014 Vietnam anti-China protests
 2017 Hanoi hostage crisis
 2018 Vietnam protests
Yemen 
 Yemeni Revolution
Zimbabwe
 2016–2017 Zimbabwe protests
 2018 Zimbabwean uprising
 Zimbabwe fuel protests (2019)

See also
 2020s in political history

Lists of protests